The 1992 All-Ireland Senior Ladies' Football Championship Final was the nineteenth All-Ireland Final and the deciding match of the 1992 All-Ireland Senior Ladies' Football Championship, an inter-county ladies' Gaelic football tournament for the top teams in Ireland.

Laois thought they had not done themselves justice in the 1991 final, but Waterford beat them again.

References

!
All-Ireland Senior Ladies' Football Championship Finals
Waterford county ladies' football team matches
Laois county ladies' football team matches